Bancks is a surname. Notable people with the name include:

 Carter Bancks (born 1989), Canadian professional ice hockey player
 Jacob Bancks (1662–1724), Swedish naval officer in the British service
 Jimmy Bancks (1889–1952), Australian cartoonist
 John Bancks (1709–1751), English writer
 Tristan Bancks (born 1974), Australian children's and teen author

See also
 Banks (surname)